Beware of the Maniacs is the debut studio album by The Dodos.

Track listing
All tracks written by Meric Long of The Dodos.
"Trades & Tariffs" – 5:01
"Neighbors" – 4:16
"Men" – 3:59
"Horny Hippies" – 2:59
"Beards" – 3:24
"The Ball" – 5:38
"Chickens" – 3:04
"Bob" – 3:44
"Elves" – 3:58
"Nerds" – 5:40
"Lily" – 4:07

Personnel
Meric Long - vocals, guitar, keyboards
Logan Kroeber - drums, percussions
John Askew - engineering
Roger Seibel - mastering

2006 albums
The Dodos albums